Mary Parker Follett (3 September 1868 – 18 December 1933) was an American  management consultant, social worker, philosopher and pioneer in the fields of organizational theory and organizational behavior. Along with Lillian Gilbreth, she was one of two great women management experts in the early days of classical management theory. She has been called the "Mother of Modern Management". Instead of emphasizing industrial and mechanical components, she advocated for what she saw as the far more important human element, regarding people as the most valuable commodity present within any business. She was one of the first theorists to actively write about and explore the role people had on effective management, and discuss the importance of learning to deal with and promote positive human relations as a fundamental aspect of the industrial sector.

Life
Follett was born in 1868 in Quincy, Massachusetts, to a wealthy Quaker family.  Her family was composed of Charles Allen Follett, a machinist in a local shoe factory, and Elizabeth Curtis (née Baxter) Follett, respectively of English-Scottish and Welsh descent, and a younger brother. Follett attended Thayer Academy, a collegiate preparatory day school in Braintree, Massachusetts, and spent much of her free time caring for her disabled mother. In September 1885 she enrolled in Anna Ticknor's Society to Encourage Studies at Home.

From 1890 to 1891, she studied at the University of Cambridge and then moved to study at Society for the Collegiate Instruction of Women in Cambridge (later known as Radcliffe College). For the next six years, Follett attended the university on an irregular basis, eventually graduating summa cum laude in 1898. Her Radcliffe thesis, The Speaker of the House of Representatives, was published in 1896. She would go on to apply to Harvard and get accepted.

Over the next three decades, she published many works. She was one of the first women ever invited to address the London School of Economics, where she spoke on cutting-edge management issues. She also distinguished herself in the field of management by being sought out by US President Theodore Roosevelt as his personal consultant on managing not-for-profit, nongovernmental, and voluntary organizations.

Follett died in 1933 in Boston, Massachusetts.

Ideas and influences
Mary Parker Follet defined management as "the art of getting things done through people". Follett's educational and work background would shape and influence her future theories and writings. One of her earliest career positions would see her working as a social worker in the Roxbury neighborhood of Boston from 1900 to 1908. During this period her interactions with the Roxbury community would lead her to realize the importance of community spaces as areas to meet and socialize.

Her experience in developing vocational guidance and evening programs in public schools, she would develop what would be her life's work and her theories in group dynamics. "The New State," her second writing published in 1918, would evolve from a report into her second published work. This publication would go on to lay the foundational theories for her most important theories and become a major center of attention of her career.

By participating in local recreational, educational, and advocacy groups Parker developed her ideals of participatory democracy and her ideals of society as "integrative." Observing people led Parker to believe that the boundaries of a person's identities are porous, affected by the society around them, which, in turn, is affected by the identities of the people within it. Thus the self and the society, according to Parker, are in a cycle in which they constantly help to create one another.

Organizational theory
In her capacity as a management theorist, Follett pioneered the understanding of lateral processes within hierarchical organizations (their recognition led directly to the formation of matrix-style organizations, the first of which was DuPont, in the 1920s), the importance of informal processes within organizations, and the idea of the "authority of expertise," which really served to modify the typology of authority developed by her German contemporary, Max Weber, who broke authority down into three separate categories: rational-legal, traditional and charismatic.

She recognized the holistic nature of community and advanced the idea of "reciprocal relationships" in understanding the dynamic aspects of the individual in relationship to others. Follett advocated the principle of what she termed "integration," or noncoercive power-sharing based on the use of her concept of "power with" rather than "power over."

Follett contributed greatly to the win-win philosophy, coining the term in her work with groups. Her approach to conflict was to embrace it as a mechanism of diversity and an opportunity to develop integrated solutions rather than simply compromising. She was also a pioneer in the establishment of community centers.

Writings
Follett's unique background often led her to take positions on major issues that mediated between the conventional viewpoints. In The New State, she took the position on societal change that:It is a mistake to think that social progress is to depend upon anything happening to the working people: some say that they are to be given more material goods and all will be well; some think they are to be given more "education" and the world will be saved. It is equally a mistake to think that what we need is the conversion to "unselfishness" of the capitalist class."

Likewise, her position on the labor movement was as follows:Neither working for someone nor paying someone's wages ought to give you power over them."

Transformational leadership

Ann Pawelec Deschenes (1998) found obscure reference pointing to Mary Parker Follett having coined the term "transformational leadership". She quotes from Edith A. Rusch's The Social Construction of Leadership: From Theory to Praxis (1991):...writings and lectures by Mary Parker Follett from as early as 1927 contained references to transformational leadership, the interrelationship of leadership and followership, and the power of collective goals of leaders and followers (p. 8).

Burns makes no reference to Follett in Leadership. However, Rusch was able to trace what appear to be parallel themes in the works of Burns and Follett. Rusch presents direct references in Appendix A. Pawelec (Deschenes) found further parallels of transformational discourse between Follett's (1947, 1987) work and Burns (1978).

From The Collected Papers of Mary Parker Follett (p. 247): "Moreover, we have now to lay somewhat less stress than formerly on this matter of the leader influencing his group because we now think of the leader as also being influenced by his group."

Influence
Although most of Follett's writings remained known in very limited circles until republished at the end of the 90's, her ideas gained great influence after Chester Barnard, a New Jersey Bell executive and advisor to President Franklin D. Roosevelt, published his seminal treatment of executive management, The Functions of the Executive. Barnard's work, which stressed the critical role of "soft" factors such as "communication" and "informal processes" in organizations, owed a telling but undisclosed debt to Follett's thought and writings. Her emphasis on such soft factors paralleled the work of Elton Mayo at Western Electric's Hawthorne Plant, and presaged the rise of the Human Relations Movement, as developed through the work of such figures as Abraham Maslow, Kurt Lewin, Douglas McGregor, Chris Argyris and other breakthrough contributors to the field of Organizational Development or "OD".

Her influence can also be seen indirectly perhaps in the work of Ron Lippitt, Ken Benne, Lee Bradford, Edie Seashore and others at the National Training Laboratories in Bethel, Maine, where T-Group methodology was first theorized and developed. Follett's work set the stage for a generation of effective, progressive changes in management philosophy, style, and practice, revolutionizing and humanizing the American workplace and allowing the fulfillment of Douglas McGregor's management vision of quantum leaps in productivity. effected through the humanization of the workplace.

Legacy
After her death, her work and ideas would disappear from American organizational and management circles of the time but continue to gain followership in Great Britain. In the last decades, her work has been rediscovered. During the 1960s, her ideas would re-emerge in Japan, where management thinkers would apply her theories to business.

Management theorist Warren Bennis said of Follett's work, "Just about everything written today about leadership and organizations comes from Mary Parker Follett's writings and lectures."

Her texts outline modern ideas under participatory management: decentralized decisions, integrating role of groups, and competition authority. Follett managed to reduce the gap between the mechanistic approach and contemporary approach that emphasizes human behavior.

Her advocacy for schools to be used after hours for recreational and vocational use affected the Boston area, where schools opened their doors after hours for such uses, and community centers were built where schools were not located, which was a revolutionary concept during the 20th century. Her experience working in that area taught her a lot about notions of democracy and led her to write more for a wider audience, particularly the business world. She believed that good practice in business would have a significant impact on other institutions.

Follett's legacy has been recognized by the establishment, in 1992, of the annual Mary Parker Follett Award for the outstanding paper to appear each year in Accounting, Auditing & Accountability Journal. The award citation states that it is named "in memory of a pioneering woman in the field of management and accountability literature who was international and interdisciplinary in her approach."

Publications
Follett authored a number of books and numerous essays, articles, and speeches on democracy, human relations, political philosophy, psychology, organizational behavior, and conflict resolution.

 The Speaker of the House of Representatives (1896)
 The New State (1918)
 Creative Experience (1924)
 Dynamic Administration: The Collected Papers of Mary Parker Follett (1942) (a collection of speeches and short articles was published posthumously)

References

Further reading
 Mousli Marc Mary Follett Pionnière du management, Diriger au-delà du conflit, Paris (France) Village Mondial, pub., 2002.

 
 
 Follett, M. P. (1949). Freedom and Co-ordination: Lectures in business organization (reprint 1987). New York: Management Publications Trust Limited.
 Follett, M. P. (1927). Dynamic administration (reprint 1942). New York: Harper & Brothers Publishers.
 Follett, M. P. (1924). Creative experience (reprint 1951). New York: Peter Smith.
 Follett, M. P. (1920). The new state: group organization the solution of popular government. New York: Longman, Green & Co.
 Pawelec (Deschenes), A. D. (1998). Towards An Understanding of Transformational Leadership in Education. Submitted in partial fulfillment of the requirements for the degree of Master of Education, University of Western Ontario (Online Library Canada).
 Héon, F., Davis A., Jones-Patulli J., Damart S. (2014). The essential Mary Parker Follett: ideas we need today, Amazon Self-publishing; 
 "Mary Parker Follett" (2005): Biography Reference Bank (H. W. Wilson).
 Stivers, Camilla. "Integrating Mary Parker Follett and Public Administration." Public Administration Review 2006: 473. JSTOR Journals.
 Phillips, John R. "Scholarship And Public Service: The Life And Work of Mary Parker Follett". Public Voices 11.2 (2010): 47–69. SocINDEX with Full Text.
 Bathurst, Ralph, and Nanette Monin. "Shaping Leadership For Today: Mary Parker Follett’S Aesthetic". Leadership 6.2 (2010): 115–131. PsycINFO.
 Snider, Keith. "Living Pragmatism: The Case of Mary Parker Follett". Administrative Theory & Praxis 1998: 274. JSTOR Journals.
 Stout, Margaret, and Jeannine M. Love. "The Unfortunate Misinterpretation of Miss Follett". Public Voices 13.2 (2013): 11–32. SocINDEX with Full Text.
 Stout, Margaret, and Jeannine M. Love (2015) [https://www.amazon.com/Integrative-Process-Follettian-Administration-Civilization/dp/1940447062/ref=sr_1_9?s=books&ie=UTF8&qid=1431784726&sr=1-9&keywords=integrative+process Integrative Process: Follettian Thinking from Ontology to Administration]. Anoka, MN: Process Century Press.
 "Follett, Mary Parker (1868–1933)" (2013): Credo Reference Collections.
 Parker, L. D. "Control in Organizational Life: The Contribution of Mary Parker Follett." Academy of Management Review 9.4 (1984): 736–745. Business Source Complete.
 Lester, William. "Mary Parker Follett And Transforming Disaster Response". Public Voices 11.2 (2010): 70–76. SocINDEX with Full Text..
 Morse, Ricardo S. "Prophet of Participation: Mary Parker Follett and Public Participation in Public Administration." Administrative Theory & Praxis 2006: 1. JSTOR Journals.
 Gibson, Jane Whitney, et al. "Examining The Work of Mary Parker Follett Through The Lens of Critical Biography." Journal of Management History (1751–1348) 19.4 (2013): 441. Publisher Provided Full Text Searching File.
 Fry, Brian R., and J. C. N. Raadschelders. Mastering Public Administration: From Max Weber To Dwight Waldo / Brian R. Fry, University of South Carolina; Jos C. N. Raadschelders, The Ohio State University. n.p.: Washington, D.C.: CQ Press, 2014., 2014. Texas State – Alkek Library's Catalog.
 Natemeyer, Walter E., and Paul Hersey. Classics of Organizational Behavior (edited by Walter E. Natemeyer, Paul Hersey). n.p.: Long Grove, IL: Waveland Press, © 2011. Texas State-Alkek Library's Catalog.
 Witzel, Morgen. The Encyclopedia of the History of American Management/General Editor, Morgen Witzel. n.p.: Bristol: Thoemmes Continuum, ©2005. Texas State – Alkek Library's Catalog.
 "Constructive Conflict: Advice from the Mother of Modern Management". ChangingWinds. N.p., 16 December 2009; retrieved 21 April 2015.
 
 Stohr, Mary, Collins, Peter A., Criminal Justice Management, 2nd Ed.: Theory and Practice in Justice-Centered Organizations. United Kingdom: Taylor Francis Ltd, 2013.

External links

 The Mary Parker Follett Network website, include full texts of many Follett works
 Full text of The New State
 Pages image of Creative Experience
 Rusch, Edith A. The Social Construction of Leadership: Theory to Praxis.
 Mary Parker Follett, The Law of the Situation (1925)

1868 births
1933 deaths
American organizational theorists
American management consultants
Public administration scholars
Radcliffe College alumni
American women academics
People from Quincy, Massachusetts